The 2022 CDC Tour consisted of 12 darts tournaments on the 2022 PDC Pro Tour. The tournament is exclusively for players from the United States and Canada, with each nation hosting two weekends of three events, making a total of 12 tournaments. The highest ranking player from each nation qualified for the 2023 PDC World Darts Championship.

Prize money
The prize money for CDC Tour events is as follows:

May

CDC Tour 1  
Tour 1 (also known as the Galaxy Grand Prix) was contested on Saturday 14 May at American Legion Post 331, Brownsburg, United States.

CDC Tour 2 
Tour 2 (also known as the Indianapolis 501) was contested on Saturday 14 May at American Legion Post 331, Brownsburg, United States.

CDC Tour 3 
Tour 3 was contested on Sunday 15 May at American Legion Post 331, Brownsburg, United States.

June

CDC Tour 4  
Tour 4 (also known as the Cosmo Classic) was contested on Saturday 25 June at Cambridge Newfoundland Club, Cambridge, Canada.

CDC Tour 5 
Tour 5 (also known as the Boomerang Tours Fiesta) was contested on Saturday 25 June at Cambridge Newfoundland Club, Cambridge, Canada.

CDC Tour 6 
Tour 6 (also known as the Magic Darts Masters) was contested on Sunday 26 June at Cambridge Newfoundland Club, Cambridge, Canada.

August

CDC Tour 7 
Tour 7 (also known as the Cosmo Darts Challenge) was contested on Saturday 13 August 2022 at American Legion Post 331, Brownsburg, United States.

CDC Tour 8 
Tour 8 was contested on Saturday 13 August 2022 at American Legion Post 331, Brownsburg, United States.

CDC Tour 9 
Tour 9 (also known as the Galaxy Barrel Bash) was contested on Sunday 14 August 2022 at American Legion Post 331, Brownsburg, United States.

September

CDC Tour 10 
Tour 10 (also known as the Magic Darts Derby) was contested on Saturday 10 September 2022 at Royal Canadian Legion Branch 551, Waterdown, Canada.

CDC Tour 11 
Tour 11 (also known as the Galaxy Gold Cup) was contested on Saturday 10 September 2022 at Royal Canadian Legion Branch 551, Waterdown, Canada.

CDC Tour 12 
Tour 12 (also known as the 9/11 Memorial) was contested on Sunday 11 September 2022 at Royal Canadian Legion Branch 551, Waterdown, Canada.

References 

2022 in darts
2022 PDC Pro Tour
May 2022 sports events in the United States
June 2022 sports events in Canada
August 2022 sports events in the United States
September 2022 sports events in Canada